"Meri Awaz Suno" (Urdu: میری آواز سنو, literal English translation: "listen to my voice") is a song by the Pakistani sufi rock band Junoon, released in 1995. It is the second track from the band's fourth album, Azadi (1997), released on EMI Records. The song was written by lead guitarist Salman Ahmad and writer Sabir Zafar. It remains one of the band's most popular songs.

The song has also been featured in several other albums by the band like Kashmakash (1995) and Dewaar: The Best of Junoon (2004).

Music video
The music video of "Meri Awaz Suno" was shot at the Jazba-e-Junoon weekend show, a patriotic show. The music video is about 4 minutes and 48 seconds long. The video showcased the whole band's line-up at several different camera shots, mostly focused on the three band members. The music video also showed some of the session players playing along with the band such as Ustad Aashiq Ali playing the tabla.

Track listing
Meri Awaz Suno

Personnel

Junoon
Salman Ahmad - vocals, lead guitar
Ali Azmat - vocals, backing vocals
Brian O'Connell - bass guitar, backing vocals

Additional musicians
Ustad Aashiq Ali - Tambourin, Tabla

References

External links
 Junoon Official Website
 Meri Awaz Suno Official Lyrics

1995 singles
Junoon (band) songs
1995 songs
Songs written by Salman Ahmad
EMI Records singles